Beregazzo con Figliaro is a comune (municipality) within the Province of Como, Lombardy, Italy.

Beregazzo con Figliaro borders the following municipalities: Appiano Gentile, Binago, Castelnuovo Bozzente, Lurate Caccivio, Olgiate Comasco, Oltrona di San Mamette, Solbiate.

Demographic evolution

References

Cities and towns in Lombardy